Janusz Kalbarczyk (13 June 1910 – 2 March 1999) was a Polish speed skater and architect. He competed in two events at the 1936 Winter Olympics.

He was married with speed skater Jadwiga Nowacka. They had four children together  (Bożena, Elżbieta, Dorota and Andrzej). Bożena Kalbarczyk also became a speed skater, who competed at international level.

References

1910 births
1999 deaths
Polish male speed skaters
Olympic speed skaters of Poland
Speed skaters at the 1936 Winter Olympics
Speed skaters from Warsaw
People from Warsaw Governorate